Riencourt-lès-Cagnicourt (literally Riencourt near Cagnicourt) is a commune in the Pas-de-Calais department in the Hauts-de-France region of France.

Geography

Population

Places of interest
 The church of St.Vaast, rebuilt along with most of the village, after World War I.

See also
Communes of the Pas-de-Calais department

References

External links

 Official website of Riencourt les Cagnicourt

Riencourtlescagnicourt